NGC 7767 is a 14th-magnitude lenticular galaxy located within the constellation Pegasus. It was discovered in 1872 by Ralph Copeland using Lord Rosse’s 72-inch telescope. It is an S0a type galaxy with a redshift of 0.026829.

References

7767
Pegasus (constellation)
IC objects
Spiral galaxies